Dixie, Kentucky may refer to the following places in the U.S. state of Kentucky:

Dixie, Henderson County, Kentucky, an unincorporated community
Dixie, Whitley County, Kentucky, an unincorporated community